Roswyn Hakesley-Brown, CBE, MPhil, BA, RN, RM, DN (Lond), Cert Ed (Birmingham) is a British nurse and researcher. She was president of the Royal College of Nursing (2000–02).

In July 2004, then-Minister for Health, John Hutton MP, launched a strategy for integrating refugee nurses into the health and social care workforce. The strategy was developed by the Refugee Nurses Task Force which she chaired. Hakesley-Brown was Special Education Projects Manager at the University of Glamorgan. 

She was appointed CBE in the 2007 New Year Honours.

References 

Academics of the University of Glamorgan
British nurses
Commanders of the Order of the British Empire
Place of birth missing (living people)
Year of birth missing (living people)
Living people
Presidents of the Royal College of Nursing